Laniellus is a genus of passerine birds in the family Leiothrichidae.

Taxonomy
These species were both formerly placed in the genus Crocias but under the rules of the International Code of Zoological Nomenclature Laniellus Swainson, 1832 has priority over Crocias Temminck, 1836. The type species is the spotted crocias.

Species
The genus contains two species:
 Spotted crocias (Laniellus albonotatus)
 Grey-crowned crocias (Laniellus langbianis)

References

 Collar, N. J. & Robson, C. 2007. Family Timaliidae (Babblers)  pp. 70 – 291 in; del Hoyo, J., Elliott, A. & Christie, D.A. eds. Handbook of the Birds of the World, Vol. 12. Picathartes to Tits and Chickadees. Lynx Edicions, Barcelona.

 
Bird genera
Leiothrichidae
Taxonomy articles created by Polbot